The 1972 West Virginia gubernatorial election took place on November 7, 1972, to elect the governor of West Virginia. Incumbent governor Arch A. Moore, Jr. successfully ran for reelection to a second term. This was the first time a governor was reelected in state history. 

Both the primaries and general election were held in the aftermath of the Buffalo Creek flood and a movement to abolish strip mining in the state. Democratic nominee Jay Rockefeller campaigned on a proposal to abolish strip mining entirely if elected.

Democratic primary

Candidates
Lee Mountcastle Kenna, Kanawha County Assessor and founder of the Sunrise Museum
Bobbie Edward Myers, Huntington businessman
Jay Rockefeller, West Virginia Secretary of State and member of the Rockefeller family

Results

General election

Results

References

1972
gubernatorial
West Virginia